Tugaryak (Tügäräk) is a rural locality (a village) in Nureyevsky Selsoviet, Sharansky District, Bashkortostan, Russia. The population was 3 as of 2010. There is 1 street.

Geography 
Tugaryak is located 31 km southeast of Sharan (the district's administrative centre) by road. Syunbash is the nearest rural locality.

References 

Rural localities in Sharansky District